Nuffield Health Cambridge Hospital is a private hospital in Cambridge, England.

History
The facility was founded by C Morland Agnew as the Evelyn Nursing Home in 1921. Agnew was motivated to establish the nursing home after his wife, Evelyn, had been poorly treated in another nursing home. Following a programme of modernisation initiated by Agnew's grandson, Julian, in 1974, which allowed the facility to specialise in acute medical and surgical cases, it was renamed the Evelyn Hospital in 1983. After the site was acquired by Nuffield Health in 2003, a new extension, built at a cost of £30 million, was opened in July 2015.

Services
In 2016 it was the first hospital ever to be classed overall as "outstanding" by the Care Quality Commission.

References

Further reading

Hospitals in Cambridgeshire
Private hospitals in the United Kingdom